Alistair Donohoe (born 3 March 1995) is an Australian cyclist, who currently rides for UCI Continental team . Following a right arm impairment in 2009, Donohoe became a multiple medallist at the UCI Para-cycling Road World Championships and UCI Para-cycling Track World Championships. He won two silver medals at the 2016 Summer Paralympics and a silver and bronze medal at the 2020 Summer Paralympics.

Personal
Donohoe was born on 3 March 1995 in Nhulunbuy, Northern Territory.  In 2009, at the age of fourteen, he injured his right bicep/triceps as a result of his arm getting caught in a rope whilst trying to jump into a creek from a tree. This led to limited use in his right arm. He attended Xavier College. He lives in Brisbane, Australia.

Sports career

He took up competitive cycling in 2010 after participating in rugby union, BMX and triathlon. His love of cycling was an outcome from his time as a triathlete in Darwin, Northern Territory. He competes in both abled bodied and para-cycling. It was Michael Gallagher who after noticing Donohoe's deformed arm suggested that he consider para-cycling.
In para-cycling, he is classified as C5. At the 2013, UCI Para-cycling Track World Championships, he won bronze medals in Men's Time Trial C5 and  Men's Road Race C5. Competing at the 2014 UCI Para-cycling Track World Championships in Aguascaliente, Mexico, he won bronze medals in the Men's C5 1 km time Trial (1:03.788) and the Men's C-1-5 scratch race exhibition final. In 2014, at UCI Para-cycling World Championships in Greenville, South Carolina, he won the gold medal in the Men's Road Race C5 and finished sixth in the Men's Time Trial.

In January 2015, he finished third in the Mars Cycling Australia Road National Championships Under 23 Road Race at Buninyong, Victoria. At the 2015 UCI Para-cycling Track World Championships in Appledorn, Netherlands he won the gold medal in the Men's 15 km Scratch Race C5 and silver medals in Men's Individual Pursuit C5 and Men's 1 km time Trial C5.

At the 2015 UCI Para-cycling World Championships in Nottwil Switzerland, he won the gold medal in the Men's Road Race C5 and silver medal in the Men's Time Trial C5.

In January 2016, he finished fourth in the Mars Cycling Australia Road National Championships Under 23 Road Race at Buninyong, Victoria. At the 2016 UCI Para-cycling Track World Championships in Montichiari, Italy, he finished second to fellow Australian Michael Gallagher in the Men's 4 km Individual Pursuit C5. He also won the bronze medals in the Men's 1 km Time Trial C5 and Men's Scratch Race C4–5.

At the 2016 Rio Paralympics, he won silver medals in the Men's Individual Pursuit C5 and the Men's Road Time Trial C5. In the C4-5 road race he sensationally collided with Ukraine's Yehor Dementyev as they sprinted towards the finish line. The two leaders were jostling for victory in their 84 km event before Dementyev, later disqualified, veered into the path of the Australian and they both crashed to the ground. Donohoe ran across the line without his bike, a move which proved to be his undoing.

At the 2017 UCI Para-cycling Track World Championships in Los Angeles, United States, Donohoe won a silver medal in the Men's Scatch Race C4-5.

At the 2017 UCI Para-cycling Road World Championships, Pietermaritzburg, South Africa, he finished eighth in the Men's Time Trial C5 and seventh in the Men's Road Race C4-5.

Donohoe won the silver medal in the Men's Scratch Race C4-5 at the 2018 UCI Para-cycling Track World Championships, Rio de Janeiro, Brazil

He won the gold medal in the Men's Road Race C5 at 2018 UCI Para-cycling Road World Championships, Maniago, Italy.

At the 2019 UCI Para-cycling Track World Championships in Apeldoorn, Netherlands, he won gold medals in Men's Individual Pursuit C5 and Men's Scratch Race C5.

At the 2019 UCI Para-cycling Road World Championships in Emmem, Netherlands, he won the gold medal in the Men's Time Trial C5 and bronze medal in the Men's Road Race C5.

At the 2020 UCI Para-cycling Track World Championships, Milton, Ontario, he won the gold medal in the Men's Scratch Race C5.

At the 2020 Tokyo Paralympics, Donohoe won the silver medal in the Men's individual pursuit C5 with a time of 4:20.813, less than 4 seconds behind the eventual winner Dorian Foulton of France. He also won the bronze medal in the Men's road time trial C5. He finished fifth in the Men's Road Race C4–5 after crashing twice during the race.

After Men's Road Race C4–5 he said:

Donohoe won the bronze medal in the Men's Road Race C5 and finished 5th in the Men's Time Trial C5 at 2022 UCI Para-cycling Road World Championships in Baie-Comeau.

At the 2022 UCI Para-cycling Track World Championships in  Saint-Quentin-en-Yvelines, France, he won the gold medal in Men's Scratch C4, silver medal in the Men's Omnium C5 and the bronze medal in Mixed Team Sprint C1-5.

In 2021, he is a Victorian Institute of Sport scholarship holder.

Recognition
 2014 – Victorian Institute of Sport 2XU Youth Award for athletes under the age of 20.
 2014 – Cycling Australia Elite Para-cycling Male Athlete of the Year.
 2015 – Cycling Australia Elite Para-cycling Male Athlete of the Year.
 2015 – Australian Institute of Sport Awards#AIS Para Performance of the Year
2018 – Cycling Australia Elite Para-cycling Male Athlete of the Year.
2018 -Victorian Institute of Sport Para Athlete Year.
2019 -Cycling Australia Para Male Track Cyclist of the Year.
2022 - AusCycling Men's Road Para-cyclist of the Year

References

External links
 
 Alistair Donohoe  at Cycling Australia
 
 

Australian male cyclists
Paralympic cyclists of Australia
Cyclists at the 2016 Summer Paralympics
Cyclists at the 2020 Summer Paralympics
Medalists at the 2016 Summer Paralympics
Medalists at the 2020 Summer Paralympics
Paralympic silver medalists for Australia
Paralympic bronze medalists for Australia
Cyclists from Victoria (Australia)
Victorian Institute of Sport alumni
1995 births
Living people
Sportsmen from the Northern Territory
Paralympic medalists in cycling